Princess Maria Josepha of Saxony (31 May 1867 – 28 May 1944) was the mother of Emperor Charles I of Austria and the fifth child of George of Saxony and Infanta Maria Anna of Portugal.

Early life
Maria Josepha Louise Philippina Elisabeth Pia Angelica Margaretha was the daughter of the future King George of Saxony (1832–1904) and Infanta Maria Anna of Portugal (1843–1884).

Marriage

On 2 October 1886 at age nineteen, she married Archduke Otto Franz of Austria, "der Schöne" (the handsome), younger brother of the Archduke Franz Ferdinand who would later be killed in Sarajevo.

A pious woman, only her strength of religion enabled her to bear the burdens of marriage to the notoriously womanizing "gorgeous Archduke". His frequent absences from his family helped her goal of keeping her children away from his bad influence succeed. Eventually, however, she herself entered into a close friendship with the actor Otto Tressler, who had been presented to her by the emperor Franz Joseph, who felt sorry for her because of the adultery of her spouse. Maria Josepha often invited Tressler to her home; he sometimes met her husband and his friends in the doorway. When her husband died, her ability to avoid extravagant displays of grief was much admired. As a widow, she ended her relationship with Tressler, probably because of her sense of what was appropriate behaviour for a widow.
During World War I she nursed the wounded in the Augarten Palace of Vienna, which had been converted into a hospital.

In 1919 she left Austria with her son Emperor Charles I of Austria and his wife, Zita of Bourbon-Parma, and went into exile with them. She lived first in Switzerland and from 1921 in Germany.

She died at Schloss Wildenwart, Upper Bavaria at age 76, a property owned by some members of the Royal Family of Bavaria. She is buried in the New Vault of the Imperial Crypt in Vienna, beside her husband.

Children

With Archduke Otto Franz she had issue:
 Archduke Karl Franz of Austria, the last Emperor of Austria.
 Archduke Maximilian Eugen of Austria (1895–1952), who married Princess Franziska von Hohenlohe-Waldenburg-Schillingsfürst and had issue.

Ancestry

Sources 
 Robert Seydel: Die Seitensprünge der Habsburger. Ueberreuterverlag Wien, 2005

References

House of Wettin
Saxon princesses
Austrian princesses
1867 births
1944 deaths
Nobility from Dresden
German Roman Catholics
Dames of the Order of Saint Isabel
Albertine branch
Burials at the Imperial Crypt
Daughters of kings